In 1982 TVR's then new owner Peter Wheeler found himself wanting more power than the Cologne V6-equipped Tasmin 280i could offer. Thus, based on the existing car the Tasmin 350i appeared in August 1983. Using the same chassis and body (with some minor changes), a 3.5-litre Rover V8 was installed. After a year, the "Tasmin" part of the name was dropped and the car became plain TVR 350i.

Development
The Rover-engined 350i provided the added benefit of being marketable in Arab countries, where there was a certain political resistance to buying Ford products because of Ford's close dealings with Israel. The 350i also provided the basis for the 390SE first seen at the Birmingham Motor Show in October 1984, as well as the extreme 420/450 SEAC and other future developments. A modified form of the 350i's chassis, itself a stretched version of the chassis used for the old M-series, also underpinned the S-series as well as the later Griffith. There was a short run of non-factory Sprintex supercharged 350SX (and the bigger hearted 400SX) made by the Northern TVR Centre in the mid-1980s. Nine and two of the respective versions are thought to have been built. Power is not certain, but  for the 350SX is commonly cited.

By 1989, after the introduction of the 400/450SE and 420/450 SEAC, the lineup was rationalized and the by now least powerful 350i was dropped. Over 1,000 350i's were built. The end of the run was marked by the limited edition (25 examples only) 3.9-litre TVR 350SE of 1990-91.

References

350
Sports cars
Rear-wheel-drive vehicles
Cars introduced in 1983
Cars discontinued in 1989